Turid Farbregd (born 1941) is a Norwegian philologist and translator. She was awarded the Bastian Prize in 1989, for her translation of poetry by Jaan Kaplinski into Norwegian language. She received the Norwegian Critics Prize for Literature in 2013, for her translation of Katja Kettu's book Kätilö (The Midwife) into Norwegian.

She was appointed Government scholar in 1995.

References

1941 births
Living people
Norwegian translators
Norwegian government scholars
Translators from Finnish
Translators from Estonian
Recipients of the Order of the Cross of Terra Mariana, 3rd Class
Translators to Norwegian